Gonzalo Queipo de Llano y Sierra (5 February 1875 – 9 March 1951) was a Spanish military leader who rose to prominence during the July 1936 coup and then the Spanish Civil War and the White Terror.

Biography
A career army man, Queipo de Llano was a brigadier general in 1923 when he began to speak out against the army and Miguel Primo de Rivera. He was demoted and had to serve three years in prison. However, he refused to stop his criticism even after his release and so was dismissed altogether in 1928.

In 1930, he became a revolutionary, but on a failed attempt to overthrow King Alfonso XIII, he fled to Portugal. He returned to his native land in 1931 after the departure of Alfonso XIII and assumed command of the 1st Military District of the Spanish Republican Army. He was later appointed by President Niceto Alcalá Zamora to the president's chief of the military staff (Queipo's daughter was married to a son of Alcalá Zamora).

Even as he rose in prominence, he remained critical of the shifting governments and joined a plot to overthrow the Popular Front government in May 1936.

During the Spanish Civil War, Queipo de Llano secured the capture of Seville with a force of at least 4,000 troops and ordered mass killings. Later, he made ridiculous claims, including that the city had been defended by 100,000 armed communists and that the Nationalists had taken the city with as few as fifteen men. Frequently intoxicated (his drinking earlier in life had damaged his liver), he made maniacal radio broadcasts throughout the war in explicit language and fabricated atrocities by unionists, anarchists and the left and encouraging equivalent violence and the sexual abuse of anyone associated with Nationalist opponents in retaliation. The military plans were drawn up and directed by José Cuesta Monereo, the commander of the general staff, who ordered journalists not to report Nationalist atrocities and to tone down Queipo de Llano's more shocking broadcast comments in print. Manuel Díaz Criado, a drunken sociopath, was given the title of government military delegate for Seville and Extremadura by Queipo de Llano. He was directly responsible for the thousands of murders that followed, and he reported daily to Cuesta Monerero and Queipo de Llano. The latter tolerated his excesses until an incident forced the removal of Queipo de Llano by General Francisco Franco, who made him apologise to the Portuguese vice-consul, an ally of the Nationalists, whom Diaz Criado had accused of spying.

He was then appointed the commander of the Nationalist Army of the South. His influence began to decline in February 1938, when Franco named himself sole leader of the new state and appointed his brother-in-law, Ramón Serrano Súñer, as interior and propaganda minister. On 17 July 1939, at celebrations of the third anniversary of the Nationalist uprising, Franco awarded the Cross of San Fernando to the city of Valladolid. Queipo de Llano was miffed since he believed that Seville, his domain, was more deserving. He made openly abusive comments about Franco, who summoned him to Burgos for consultations but also sent General Andrés Saliquet to Seville to take command. Queipo de Llano was dispatched on a mission to Rome, his perceived base now gone.

Thereafter, he remained very bitter and outspoken about Franco and the Falange. His requests to return to Spain such as when his daughter emigrated to Argentina, were carefully managed and his movements monitored. In April 1950, he was made a marquis specifically for the successful coup d'état in Seville, but he continued his snipes at Franco. He died on 9 March 1951, aged 76, in his farmhouse in Gambogaz, Camas, Seville. His remains were placed in the chapel of Cristo de la Salvación in the Basilica of Macarena, whose construction he had promoted. In appreciation, the brotherhood of Esperanza Macarena named him an honorary older brother.

In 2022 his remains were relocated elsewhere under government mandate.

See also
 Carabineros

References

Further reading

 Antony Beevor (2006). The Battle for Spain. The Spanish Civil War 1936–1939. Penguin Books. 2006. 
 Tom Buchanan, (1997). Britain and the Spanish Civil War. Cambridge, United Kingdom: Cambridge University Press. 
 Gabriel Jackson, (1965). The Spanish Republic and the Civil War, 1931–1939. Princeton: Princeton University Press. . OCLC 185862219, another edition, 1967.
 
 Stanley G. Payne (1970). The Spanish Revolution. London: Weidenfeld & Nicolson. .
 Stanley G. Payne (2004). The Spanish Civil War, the Soviet Union, and Communism. New Haven; London: Yale University Press. . OCLC 186010979.
 Stanley G. Payne, (1999). Fascism in Spain, 1923–1977. University of Wisconsin Press. .
 Stanley G. Payne, (2008). Franco and Hitler: Spain, Germany, and World. New Haven, Connecticut: Yale University Press. .
 Paul Preston. The Spanish Civil War: Reaction, Revolution and Revenge. Harper Perennial. London. (2006).  / 0-393-32987-9 .
 Paul Preston (2012). The Spanish Holocaust. New York: W. W. Norton & Company. (2012), .
 Ronald Radosh; Mary Habeck, Grigory Sevostianov (2001). Spain Betrayed: The Soviet Union in the Spanish Civil War with Mary R. Habeck and Grigorii Nikolaevich Sevostianov.  New Haven and London: Yale University Press. . OCLC 186413320
 
 Hugh Thomas. The Spanish Civil War. Penguin Books. London. 2003, 4th edition. (1961, 1987, 2003). London: Penguin. . OCLC 248799351.

External links
 

1875 births
1951 deaths
People from the Province of Valladolid
Francoist Spain
Spanish lieutenant generals
Spanish military personnel of the Spanish Civil War (National faction)
Laureate Cross of Saint Ferdinand
Spanish anti-communists
Spanish propagandists
Spanish military personnel of the Spanish–American War